"Big Dreams in a Small Town" is a song recorded by American country music group Restless Heart. It was released in February 1989 as the third single and title track from the album Big Dreams in a Small Town.  The song reached number 3 on the Billboard Hot Country Singles & Tracks chart. It was written by Van Stephenson, Dave Robbins and Tim DuBois.

Content
The song is an up-tempo in which the narrator talks about wanting to leave the small-town life with his significant other when he is young. Eventually he decides to stay in the small town for the rest of his life.

Music video
The music video was directed by Bill Balsley and premiered in early 1989.

Chart performance

Year-end charts

References

1989 singles
Restless Heart songs
Songs written by Tim DuBois
Songs written by Van Stephenson
Song recordings produced by Scott Hendricks
RCA Records singles
Songs written by Dave Robbins (keyboardist)
1988 songs